Haverfordwest & Milford Haven Telegraph was a weekly English-language newspaper which circulated Pembrokeshire and Cardiganshire. The paper featured news coverage and editorials on the arts.

Welsh Newspapers Online has digitised 713 issues of the Haverfordwest & Milford Haven Telegraph (1857-1919) from the newspaper holdings of the National Library of Wales.

References

Newspapers published in Wales
1857 establishments in Wales